Althea Braithwaite (1940-2020), was an English children's author, illustrator, publisher and glass artist, best known for Desmond the Dinosaur.

Althea Braithwaite was born in Pinner, Middlesex, the younger daughter of Rosemary (née Harris) and RAF Air Vice-Marshal Francis Braithwaite.

References

1940 births
2020 deaths
English children's writers
English children's book illustrators
English publishers (people)
British glass artists
People from Pinner